Sam Perry was an American  track and field athlete who held the world record for the 60 y sprint and who was twice United States champion at that event.

Track career 
Perry ran for the Fordham University track team.

In 1965, Perry, equalled the world record of 5.9 s for 60 yards of Bob Hayes whilst running for his college track team at the Millrose Games.

In 1963 and 1965, Perry became national indoor champion at 60 y.

Accolades and awards 

In 1977, Perry was inducted into the hall of fame of the Fordham University Rams.

In 1995, Perry's old high school, Passaic High School, named their new track after him

Personal life 

Perry was also a graduate of Columbia Law School.

In later life, Perry became an attorney and a city councilman in Passaic, New Jersey.

References 

Year of birth missing (living people)
Living people
American male sprinters
Columbia Law School alumni
Fordham University alumni
New Jersey city council members
Passaic High School alumni
Sportspeople from Passaic, New Jersey
Track and field athletes from New Jersey
USA Indoor Track and Field Championships winners